Ryan Groeneveld (born 5 October 1981) is a South African cricketer. He played in 15 first-class and 18 List A matches for Boland from 2002 to 2007.

See also
 List of Boland representative cricketers

References

External links
 

1981 births
Living people
South African cricketers
Boland cricketers
Cricketers from Paarl